The Romanian Institute in Albania, formally the Romanian Institute for Archaeological Research and Studies, was a scientific organization in the Albanian town of Sarandë, subordinated to the Romanian Ministry of Education between 25 July 1938 and 1 November 1940. The institute was meant to coordinate archaeological excavations conducted by Romanian teams in agreement with the Albanian state.

A parcel of 746 square meters, with a coastline on the Adriatic, was donated in April 1932 by King Zog of Albania to the Romanian historian and politician Nicolae Iorga, in recognition for the latter's entire scholarly activity on Albanian history. Under Iorga's patronage, a Romanian Scientific Mission in Albania was created on 13 July 1934 to perform "philological, ethnographical, archaeological and historical research". Consequently, on 13 August 1934, Iorga donated half of this land in Sarandë to the Romanian State to serve as the Mission's headquarters. As the parcel was deemed to small for the projected edifice, new requests were made to the Albania Royal Family and to the Albanian Red Cross for further donations. Ultimately, on 21 September 1937, another 680 square metres were donated personally to Nicolae Iorga.

The foundation of the Mission's building were laid in a ceremony on 9 November 1936, however actual construction work only began in July 1937, based in the plans of Romanian architect Petre Antonescu. Due to lack of funds, the projected second floor was never built, and the length of its facade was reduced to two thirds.

The institute was formally created on 25 July 1938, however its building was finalised only in the spring of 1939. The Italian invasion of Albania in April 1939 prevented the institute from functioning in the new building, and thus its secretary, Dumitru Berciu, had to entrust the building and the parcel to the Sarandë township. The Institute itself was formally disbanded on 1 November 1940. After Italian attempts to buy the building in November 1940 failed, the building was confiscated and converted into a military hospital. Through the efforts of Berciu, the institute was formally re-established on 13 May 1943, without any actual activity taking place in Albania, soon to be placed under German occupation. Berciu continued to perform administrative tasks related to the Institute at least until February 1944, and in 1945 he published a lecture on the Paleolithic and Mesolithic in the Balkans using the institute's title on the cover page. The building was confiscated by the Albanian state in the years following World War II, and became private property after 1990, with the Romanian Ministry of Foreign Affairs making a formal claim in the 2010s.

References 

Greater Romania
Albanian Kingdom (1928–1939)
1938 establishments in Albania
1938 establishments in Romania
1939 disestablishments in Albania
1940 disestablishments in Romania
1943 establishments in Romania
Sarandë
Albania–Romania relations